Muḥammad ibn ʿAlī ibn Abī Ṭālib also known as Muḥammad ibn al-Ḥanafīyya (15 AH – 81 AH;  AD 637 – 700) and surnamed Abū al-Qāsim. He was the third son of Ali ibn Abi Talib (the fourth rightly-guided caliph and the first Shia Imam).

Biography 
Muhammad ibn al-Hanafiyya (Muhammad al-Akbar) was born in Medina about AD 633 (though also said to be during Umar's era), the third of Ali's sons. He was called Ibn al-Hanafiyya after his mother, Khawla bint Ja'far; she was known as Hanafiyya, "the Hanafi woman", after her tribe Banu Hanifa. After the death of Muhammad, the people of Yamama were declared apostates by the Muslims for refusing to pay the zakat (religious tax); the men were killed (see Ridda Wars), and the women were taken to Medina as slaves, Khawla bint Ja'far among them. When her tribesmen found out, they approached Ali and asked him to save her from slavery and to protect her family's honor and prestige. Consequently, Ali ibn Abi Talib purchased her, set her free, and, after the passing away of Fatima, married her. Muhammad ibn al-Hanafiyya was the only child of Khawla bint Ja'far. During his father's lifetime he distinguished himself for piety, rectitude, and courage and effectiveness in war. During Ali's caliphate at Kufa he was one of the caliph's four chief lieutenants. He particularly distinguished himself at the battles of Jamal and Siffin. During the Battle of Siffin, Ali described ibn al-Hanafiyya as his hand due to his bravery and strength while fighting.

When Husayn, then in Mecca, was considering the expedition to Kufa that ended at Karbala, Muhammad ibn al-Hanafiyya advised him not to go, pointing out that the men of Kufa had betrayed and turned against their father Ali and their brother Hasan ibn Ali, and saying that he feared that they would betray Husayn as well. Husayn replied that he feared that if he stayed in Mecca, Yazid ibn Mu'awiya would have him killed there, and violate the sanctity of the Holy City. Muhammad ibn al-Hanafiyya then urged him to go instead to Yemen, where he could indefinitely elude an army. The next day Husayn replied that his grandfather Muhammad had appeared to him in a dream and required him to undertake this sacrificial expedition.

After Husayn and so many of his kinsmen died at Karbala and the young Ali ibn Husayn Zayn al-Abidin adopted a life of retirement and prayer, Muhammad ibn al-Hanafiyya became the visible head of the house of Ali (see Kaysanites). It was in his name that Al-Mukhtar rebelled in Kufa in 685. In the hajj of 688, four men led their respective followers in the rites of pilgrimage, claiming the headship of Islam. One was Muhammad ibn al-Hanafiyya, leading the Shi'ites. The others were Abd Allah ibn al-Zubayr, who ruled in Mecca; Abd al-Malik ibn Marwan, the Umayyad, who ruled in Damascus; and Najda ibn Amir al-Hanafi, leader of the Kharijites.

Ibn al-Hanafiyya was called "the Mahdi," "the rightly-guided," which then was simply a pledge of confidence in his knowledge, character, and judgment over those of the rival caliphs. In 692 he traveled to Damascus and swore allegiance to Abd al-Malik ibn Marwan. In 700 he died in Medina, but thereafter a legend grew up that he was not dead, but living in seclusion on Mount Radwa near Medina, protected and fed by wild animals, and that he would, in God's good time, return to establish justice and true religion in the world. Thus arose the legend of the Mahdi as savior.

Succession and legacy 
After Muhammad ibn al-Hanafiyya died, his son Abu Hashim claimed the imamate. After his death the Abbasids claimed that on his deathbed Abu Hashim nominated his distant cousin Muhammad ibn Ali ibn Abd Allah ibn Abbas ibn Abd al-Muttalib ibn Hashim as the imam. This man's son Abu al-Abbas Abd Allah as-Saffah became the first Abbasid caliph, repudiating Shi'ism, which effectively extinguished the sect that had recognized Muhammad ibn al-Hanafiyya as an imam.

His ancestors and family tree

References

External links 
 

Tabi‘un
630s births
700 deaths
Children of Ali
Arab princes
7th-century Arabs
Mahdism